was a Japanese politician. He served as the former mayor of Osaka from 1995 until 2003 and professor emeritus of Osaka City University.

Isomura was born in the city of Osaka and graduated from Osaka City University.

Isomura initially began his career as an economics professor at Osaka City University. He became vice mayor of Osaka in April 1990 at the request of former Osaka Mayor Masaya Nishio. Isomura succeeded Nishio when he was elected mayor in December 1995. One of Isomura's main goals during his time in office was to make Osaka the host city for the 2008 Summer Olympic Games. However, Osaka lost its bid to Beijing at the meeting of the International Olympic Committee in July 2001.

Takafumi Isomura died of hepatocellular carcinoma at a hospital in Osaka on November 26, 2007. He was 76 years old.

References 

1930 births
2007 deaths
People from Osaka
Japanese economists
Mayors of Osaka
Deaths from liver cancer
Deaths from cancer in Japan